DMP may refer to:

In science and technology
 2,2-Dimethoxypropane, a chemical reagent
 2,6-dimethylphenol, a monomer
 Data management plan, generally submitted as part of research grant proposals
 Data management platform, software for managing online advertising and customer data as part of personalized marketing
 Dess–Martin periodinane, a chemical reagent used to oxidise alcohols
 Dot matrix printer, a type of printers used very commonly in the late 20th century
 Dialer management platform, a computer that manages least-cost routing dialers
 Digital media player, a category within the Digital Living Network Alliance (DLNA) standard
 Dimethyl phthalate, a plasticizer
 Dimethyl pimelimidate, also known as dimethyl pimelimidate dihydrochloride, a cross-linking reagent
 Disease management programmes for chronic diseases  
 Dynamic multipathing, a system of computer storage
 Dynamics of Markovian particles, in statistical mechanics, the basis of a theory for kinetics of particles
 DMP, a file suffix in Microsoft Windows used to indicate a file containing core dump data
 Digital Media Professionals, a Japanese GPU design company who designed the PICA200 chip

Medical
 Doctor of medical physics, a degree in medical physics
 Dance movement therapy (in the UK) or "dance therapy" (in the US and Australia)
 Differentially Methylated Positions, DMPs, part of Differentially methylated region

In entertainment
 Demotivational poster
 Digital Manga Publishing, a North American company that publishes manga
 Digital matte painter
 Digital matte painting, a form of matte painting
 DMP Digital Music Products, a jazz record label founded in 1983 by Tom Jung
 Donaldson, Moir and Paterson, a Scottish rock band
 Drayton Manor Theme Park, a theme park in Staffordshire, England

Other uses
 Debt management plan
 Desert Memorial Park, a cemetery near Palm Springs, California
 Dhaka Metropolitan Police
 Disability management program, used by employers to assist employees who are unable to work due to injury or illness
 Dublin Metropolitan Police, the police force of Dublin, Ireland, from 1836 to 1925
 Dual-member proportional representation, a proposed voting system developed in Canada